Page Eight is a 2011 British political thriller, written and directed for the BBC by the British dramatist David Hare, his first film as director since the 1989 film Strapless. The cast includes Bill Nighy, Rachel Weisz, Michael Gambon, Tom Hughes, Ralph Fiennes, and Judy Davis. The film was followed by Turks & Caicos (2014) and Salting the Battlefield (2014), which were broadcast on BBC Two in March 2014. The three films are collectively known as The Worricker Trilogy.

Plot summary 
Johnny Worricker is a long-serving MI5 officer. His best friend and superior, director general Benedict Baron, summons Johnny to a meeting with MI5 agent Jill Tankard and Home Secretary Anthea Catcheside regarding a potentially explosive report. Worricker highlights a note at the foot of page eight alleging that Prime Minister Alec Beasley has knowledge of secret overseas prisons where American authorities have tortured terror suspects. If true, Beasley did not share any intelligence gained with the security services, at the possible expense of British lives.

At the same time, Johnny begins spending time with his neighbour Nancy Pierpan, a Syrian-born political activist whose brother was killed by the Israeli military. Johnny shares his love of modern art and jazz with Nancy but, wondering if she aims to exploit his connections, asks friend and covert intelligence operative Rollo to investigate her. Meanwhile, Baron dies of a heart attack at his country home before he can make the report public. Beasley orders the report to be buried and tells Johnny of his plans to replace MI5 with a US-style Homeland Security organisation. Catcheside's silence is bought by naming her Deputy Prime Minister.

Johnny sells a valuable Christopher Wood painting from his own art collection, for cash. He breaks into the studio of an acquaintance of Nancy's, seen loitering around the apartment building, and learns that the acquaintance is Tankard's son and has been paid to monitor him. Johnny realises that Beasley and Tankard are running a politicised "cowboy" intelligence operation. Johnny gives Nancy a copy of the secret file on her brother's death but points out that he would be implicated if its existence were to be revealed by her. Johnny ends up making a deal with Tankard to keep quiet about the report. In return for Johnny's silence, Tankard agrees to kill the reorganisation of the intelligence services and leak the file on Nancy's brother's murder to the BBC. The fallout forces Johnny to disappear for his safety.

Johnny gives Nancy another Christopher Wood painting from his collection and tells her she can have his car, as he is leaving the country. On seeing the leaked report of her brother's murder on the news, she realises that Johnny arranged it to allow her to pursue a legal case against the Israelis without implicating himself. At Stansted Airport, Johnny dumps the original report incriminating Beasley in a rubbish bin. As Johnny looks at the departure screen, Nancy looks closely at Johnny's painting, of a church near a beach.

Cast 

 Bill Nighy as Johnny Worricker, MI5 analyst
 Rachel Weisz as Nancy Pierpan, political activist
 Michael Gambon as Benedict Baron, Director General of MI5
 Judy Davis as Jill Tankard, MI5 officer collaborating with the Prime Minister
 Tom Hughes as Ralph Wilson, private investigator and Jill Tankard's son
 Saskia Reeves as Anthea Catcheside, Home Secretary
 Ewen Bremner as Rollo Maverley, journalist and former MI5 officer
 Felicity Jones as Julianne Worricker, Johnny's daughter
 Ralph Fiennes as Alec Beasley, Prime Minister
 Alice Krige as Emma Baron, Benedict Baron's wife and Johnny's ex-wife
 Holly Aird as Anna Herve, assistant to the Home Secretary and former lover to Johnny
 Richard Lintern as Max Vallance, assistant to the Prime Minister
 Bruce Myers as Joseph Pierpan, Nancy Pierpan's father
 Rakhee Thakrar as Muna Hammami
 Kate Burdette as Allegra Betts
 Andrew Cleaver as Brian Lord
 Marthe Keller as Leona Chew
 Aisling Loftus as Melissa Legge
 James McArdle as Ted Finch
 Jay Benedict as Master of the college
 Surendra Kochar as Mrs. Ashanti
 Bijan Daneshmand as Cambridge don
 Kriss Dosanjh as Minicab owner
 Hywel Morgan as Priest
 Rory Morrison as Radio Newsreader
 Charlotte Green as Radio Newsreader

Production 
Parts were filmed in Jesus College, Cambridge, in which undergraduates and Fellows were recruited as extras.

The gallery scene where Worricker sells his painting is filmed in Saffron Walden; the property used as the gallery is on the corner of Church Street and Museum Street, number 26a and 28 Church Street. It is a listed building.

Worricker then collects his parked car from Market Hill in that town outside the Kings Arms public house.

Release
The film had its world premiere on 18 June 2011 at the Edinburgh International Film Festival and closed the 36th Toronto International Film Festival on 17 September 2011. It was broadcast on BBC Two and BBC HD on 28 August 2011 in the United Kingdom, and on PBS in the United States on 6 November 2011, as part of its Masterpiece Contemporary anthology series. It was released on DVD and Blu-ray on 5 September 2013 by Universal Pictures.

Accolades 
At the 2011 Satellite Awards, Page Eight was nominated for Best Miniseries or Motion Picture Made for Television. Bill Nighy and Rachel Weisz were nominated for Best Actor in a Miniseries or a Motion Picture Made for Television and Best Actress in a Miniseries or a Motion Picture Made for Television, respectively.

Bill Nighy received a nomination for Best Actor – Miniseries or Television Film at the 2012 Golden Globe Awards.

Martin Ruhe, Page Eight's Director of Photography, won Outstanding Achievement in Cinematography in Motion Picture/Miniseries Television at the 26th American Society of Cinematographers Awards.

Page Eight received a nomination nod for Best TV Movie at the 2012 Rose d’Or TV Festival.

At the 2012 British Academy Television Awards, Page Eight was nominated for the Single Drama Award.

Paul Englishby was nominated for Best Television Soundtrack at the 2012 Ivor Novello Awards.

At the 2012 Critics' Choice Television Awards, Page Eight was nominated for Best Made for TV Movie/Mini Series, while Bill Nighy was nominated for Best Actor.

At the 2012 Primetime Emmy Awards, Judy Davis received a nomination nod in the category of Outstanding Supporting Actress in a Miniseries or Movie, while Paul Englishby won for Outstanding Original Main Title Theme Music.

References

External links 
 

2010s spy films
2011 thriller drama films
British crime films
BBC Film films
Films directed by David Hare
British political films
British spy films
British thriller drama films
2011 in British television
2011 in British politics
Films produced by David Barron
Films produced by David Heyman
MI5 in fiction
Murder in films
Spy television films
Crime television films
Action television films
British thriller television films
Films shot in Cambridgeshire
2011 films
2010s British films